The Obiekt 292, or Object 292 (Объект 292), was an experimental tank of design bureau of the Kirov Plant (JSC Spetsmash) and scientists of the All-Russian Research Institute Transmash. The prototype was based on the T-80U and with its turret. The chassis was that of a T-80BV, with few modifications, but the turret of the T-80U was up-gunned to a 152.4 smoothbore gun. The new gun had the same chamber diameter as the 125mm but was much longer. Anti-tank capacity was improved in such a way that the tank could potentially engage and destroy any Western tank of the time at battle distance with a single shot.

Design
The tank was based on the T-80's chassis, using a new turret, and was armed with an LP-83 152.4 mm smoothbore gun. A variant of the tank utilizing a rifled 152mm armament was never completed. Like most Russian tanks of its time, the gun offered poor depression and slow reload despite the presence of an autoloader. The traverse rates of the barrel and turret were also lower than the regular T-80, thanks to the heavier gun. Despite being less versatile in battle, the firepower was superior to the T-80 and other similarly-armed Russian MBTs. In September 1990 the tank was completed and in 1991 underwent trials. The trials showed high stability and reliability of the gun and the tank itself. However, the absence of funding discontinued further work on the tank's improvement.
A major benefit of this new design was that the new turret was interchangeable with the standard T-80 main battle tank turret. The Ammo rack consisted of only 16 152 mm rounds.

See also
 Object 785
 CATTB
 Leopard 2-140
 Pz 87-140
 Object 195

References

Main battle tanks of the Soviet Union
Cold War tanks of the Soviet Union
Abandoned military projects of the Soviet Union
Main battle tanks of the Cold War
History of the tank
Trial and research tanks of the Soviet Union